Charles Arthur Ford is an American former United States Department of Commerce official and diplomat who served as the director general of the United States Commercial Service from 2010 to 2013 and U.S. Ambassador to Honduras from 2005 to 2008.

Early life and education 
Ford was born in Dayton, Ohio in May 1950. He obtained his B.A. in economics from the College of William & Mary in 1972, and his M.A. in Latin American studies from George Washington University in 1975.

Career
Ford is the president of CAF International, an international market development, and strategic communication, and change management consultancy firm.

Previously, Ford served as acting assistant secretary of the United States Commercial Service at the United States Department of Commerce. In this role, he managed a $270 million budget and 1400 employees located in more than 70 countries. From 2008 to 2009, he served as the advisor on public-private partnerships to the Commander of United States Southern Command. He served as the U.S. Ambassador to Honduras from 2005 to 2008.

As a member of the United States Foreign Commercial Service since 1982, Ford has had an extensive experience in Europe and Latin America. He served as a commercial minister at the U.S. Mission to the European Union in Brussels, Belgium, commercial counselor at the U.S. Embassy in Caracas, Venezuela, commercial minister at the U.S. Embassy in London, United Kingdom, commercial attaché at the U.S. Embassy in Guatemala, commercial consul at the U.S. Consulate in Barcelona, Spain, and commercial attaché at the U.S. Embassy in Buenos Aires. 

From 1990 to 1994, he served as the deputy assistant secretary for International Operations of the USFCS and as director of Latin American Trade Policy in the International Trade Administration.

Memberships 
Ford is the Treasurer of the American Foreign Service Association and he is a member of the American Academy of Diplomacy. He is on the board of several organizations, including the PDI Group, The Thomas Jefferson Program in Public Policy, the Trachtenberg School of Public Policy and Public Administration, and the Ringgold–Carroll House.

Recognition 
Ford received the President's Award for Distinguished Service in 2008 and the Joint Distinguished Civilian Service Award from the Chairman of the Joint Chiefs, Department of Defense in 2009. He earned the Silver Medal for expansion of the U.S. and Foreign Commercial Service network into the former Soviet Union, the Department of Commerce Gold Medal for Distinguished Achievement in Federal Service, and the Department of Commerce/International Trade Administration Bronze Medal for outstanding achievement at the United States Mission to the European Union.

Personal life 
Ford lives in the Washington D.C. area and is married to Lillian Ford. They have two adult children, Monica Ann and Michael Arthur.

References

1950 births
Living people
Ambassadors of the United States to Honduras
People from Dayton, Ohio
George Washington University alumni
College of William & Mary alumni
Department of Commerce Gold Medal
Commercial attachés